Hagjer or Hagjersa is a Dimasa language surname meaning "intermediary". Notable people with this name include:

 Bir Bhadra Hagjer
 Joy Bhadra Hagjer

References 

Dimasa-language surnames